Théo Valls (born 18 December 1995) is a French professional footballer who plays as a midfielder for the Swiss club Servette.

Club career
Valls is a youth exponent from Nîmes Olympique. He made his Ligue 2 debut at 23 September 2014 against Châteauroux replacing Fethi Harek at half-time in a 1–0 home win.

References

Living people
1995 births
Association football midfielders
French footballers
Expatriate footballers in Switzerland
French expatriate sportspeople in Switzerland
Ligue 1 players
Ligue 2 players
Championnat National 3 players
Swiss Super League players
Nîmes Olympique players
Servette FC players